Paddy is a 1970 Irish comedy film directed by Daniel Haller and starring Milo O'Shea, Des Cave and Dearbhla Molloy. The film follows the adventures of a Dublin butcher's assistant.

It was made for $250,000 and sold to Allied Artists for $750,000. Roger Corman helped finance it.

Cast
 Milo O'Shea – Harry Redmond
 Des Cave – Paddy Maguire
 Dearbhla Molloy – Maureen
 Maureen Toal – Clair Kearney
 Peggy Cass – Irenee
 Judy Cornwell – Breeda
 Donal LeBlanc – Larry Maguire
 Lillian Rapple – Mrs Doyle
 Desmond Perry – Cahill
 Marie O'Donnell – Mrs Maguire

References

External links

1970 films
Irish comedy films
1970 comedy films
Films directed by Daniel Haller
1970s English-language films